Captain Arun Singh Jasrotia, AC, SM (16 August 1968 - 15 September  1995) was an Indian military officer in the 9 Para (Special Forces).  He was posthumously awarded the Ashoka Chakra, the highest peace time military decoration in India. He was also recipient of Sena Medal.

On 15 September 1995, terrorists attacked Jasrotia's team in Lolab Valley in Jammu and Kashmir. In retaliation, Jasrotia killed a terrorist with his commando knife and neutralized the other terrorists by lobbing grenades at them. This gave his team an opportunity to take control of the situation and eliminate the remaining terrorists. But Jasrotia sustained gunshot wounds in the process and succumbed to the injuries.

Early life 
Captain Arun Singh Jasrotia was born in Sujanpur in the Pathankot district of Punjab, India on 16 August, 1968. Son of an Army veteran Lt Col Prabhat Singh Jasrotia and Satya Devi, Capt Arun Singh Jasrotia belonged to the family of war veterans. Besides his father, his grandfather too served in the Army and retired as a Lt Col with 2 Dogra Regiment.

Military career 
Capt Arun also had a dream to wear Army uniform like his father and grandfather and followed his dream by joining NDA after completing his schooling at Kendriya Vidyalaya No. 1, in Pathankot. He was commissioned into 8 Bihar Regiment on 17 December 1988 as a second lieutenant, with promotion to lieutenant on 17 December 1990 and to captain on 17 December 1993.

During his initial service, Capt Arun took part in “Op Rakshak” under 8 Mountain Division and 28 Inf Div sector and proved his mettle as a professional and committed soldier. He was awarded Sena Medal for his exceptional service and devotion to duty. Later Capt Arun volunteered for 9 Para (Special Forces).

Lolab Valley Operation 
During his initial service, Capt Arun took part in “Op Rakshak” under 8 Mountain Division and 28 Inf Div sector and proved his mettle as a professional and committed soldier. He was awarded Sena Medal for his exceptional service and devotion to duty. Later Capt Arun was inducted into 9 Para (Special Forces) a unit known for daredevil operations in very demanding situations.

Capt Arun along with his troops swung into action and set off to an arduous climb towards the suspected hideout. After about nearly ten hours the team reached the general area at a height approximately 3000 meters in the Lolab Valley of Jammu & Kashmir. As the team came closer to the cave, they were attacked by the militants from well-entrenched positions. Captain Arun, having realized the situation decided to face the terrorists himself and killed one with his commando knife. He killed one more terrorist with a hand grenade and lunged forward towards the cave.

While moving forward towards the cave Capt Arun got hit by a bullet in the shoulder and was grievously injured. But he refused to move back and in a rare show of courage, shot dead the terrorist who had fired at him. When he reached near the cave, he was hit by two more bullets in the gut and chest and collapsed. Inspired by his bravery and leadership, the troops attacked the militants with double vigour and aggression and eliminated all of them. Capt Arun was martyred and he was awarded the nation's highest peace time gallantry award “Ashok Chakra” for his outstanding courage, devotion to duty and supreme sacrifice. Punjab government also conferred Captain Arun Singh Jasrotia with the Nishan-e-Khalsa Award in 1999.
Capt Arun Singh Jasrotia is survived by his parents Lt Col Prabhat Singh Jasrotia and Mrs Satya Devi.

References

Punjabi Hindus
Recipients of the Ashoka Chakra (military decoration)
Ashoka Chakra
Para Commandos
1968 births
1995 deaths